KTWF (95.5 FM, "K-Hits") is a radio station licensed to Scotland, Texas serving the Wichita Falls, Texas area with a classic hits format. The station is owned and operated by LKCM Radio Group. KTWF's studios are located on Call Field Rd in the southwest portion of Wichita Falls. The transmitter site is about seven miles north of Archer City, Texas.

History
KTWF signed on the air August 16, 1996 as KJKB. Originally branded Boss 95.5, the station aired a classic rock format. On March 4, 2013, the station changed its call sign to KXPN-FM and switched formats from classic rock to sports as 95.5 ESPN with programming from ESPN Radio.

On April 5, 2020, KXPN-FM changed their format from sports to classic country, branded as “95.5 Hank FM”. A call sign change to KTWF followed on June 2, 2020.

On November 14, 2022 KTWF changed their format from classic country to a simulcast of classic hits-formatted KOME-FM 95.5 FM Tolar, branded as "K-Hits 95.5".

Former sports programming
KXPN-FM previously aired syndicated programming from ESPN Radio. The Lone Star Outdoor Show hosted by Cable Smith aired Saturday mornings from 8-9 a.m., followed by a local show hosted by longtime Wichita Falls sports personality Andy Austin from 9-10 a.m. Austin also provided local updates weekdays at 7:25 a.m. and 9:25 a.m.

In July 2013, Midwestern State University announced KXPN-FM would be the new flagship station for Midwestern State Mustangs athletics. The station aired live broadcasts of MSU football and men's and women's basketball, as well as pregame and postgame shows. The station also aired weekly coaches' shows for the teams.

Starting with the 2015 season, KXPN-FM was the flagship station for Wichita Falls High School football, agreeing on a multi-year deal with the school.

KXPN-FM had been a radio affiliate of the Texas Rangers since 2013.

Former personalities
Former local on-air personalities included Debbie Watts, and Jackie B, of The Boss Morning Show, as well as former host and program director Jerrod Knight.

References

External links

TWF
Radio stations established in 2006
2006 establishments in Texas
Classic hits radio stations in the United States